Seven Oaks, also known as the Atkinson House, is a historic house at 82 Westwood Place in Asheville, North Carolina.  It is a single-story brick structure, with a triple-gable roof that has deep eaves.  A hip-roof porch extends across the front, supported by Tuscan columns, with modillioned and bracketed eaves.  Built in the 1870s, it is a high-quality example of Italianate architecture, and is one of only seven brick 19th-century houses in Asheville.

The house was listed on the National Register of Historic Places in 2015.

See also
National Register of Historic Places listings in Buncombe County, North Carolina

References

Houses on the National Register of Historic Places in North Carolina
Italianate architecture in North Carolina
Houses completed in 1870
Houses in Asheville, North Carolina
National Register of Historic Places in Buncombe County, North Carolina